Johnson College Prep is a public 4–year charter high school located in the Englewood neighborhood on the south side of Chicago, Illinois, United States. Johnson is a part of the Noble Network of Charter Schools and Chicago Public Schools. Opening in 2010, The school is named for John H. Johnson and his wife Eunice Johnson.

References

External links
Max Preps: Johnson College Prep
TheCharterSCALE: Johnson College Prep
Free After-School Meals Offer Healthier Foods To Noble Students

Educational institutions established in 2010
Noble Network of Charter Schools
Public high schools in Chicago
2010 establishments in Illinois